The Peruvian tyrannulet (Zimmerius viridiflavus) is a species of bird in the family Tyrannidae. As traditionally defined, it is endemic to Peru, but recent genetic evidence suggests it should include the taxon flavidifrons as a subspecies, in which case the range of the Peruvian tyrannulet extends into far southern Ecuador. Alternatively, flavidifrons is sometimes considered a separate species, the Loja tyrannulet, but it is not closely related to the golden-faced tyrannulet as previously believed.

The natural habitat of the Peruvian tyrannulet is subtropical or tropical moist montane forests.

References

 Rheindt, F. E., Norman, J. A., & Christidis, L. (2008). DNA evidence shows vocalizations to be better indicator of taxonomic limits than plumage patterns in Zimmerius tyrant-flycatchers. Molecular Evolution and Phylogenetics 48(1): 150–156.

Peruvian tyrannulet
Birds of Ecuador
Birds of Peru
Peruvian tyrannulet
Taxonomy articles created by Polbot